The Rareseed Ranch or Ruisui Ranch is a tourist attraction ranch in Wuhe Village, Ruisui Township, Hualien County, Taiwan.

History
The ranch was originally a papaya farm. It was then later transformed into a ranch. Milk produced by cows in the ranch is distributed around Taiwan by Uni-President Enterprises Corporation.

Geology
The ranch land is very fertile due to the fresh water supply from the Central Mountain Range.

Architecture
The ranch consists of dining area and outdoor café.

Transportation
The ranch is accessible southwest from Ruisui Station of the Taiwan Railways.

See also
 List of tourist attractions in Taiwan

References

External links

  

Ranches in Taiwan
Tourist attractions in Hualien County